is a passenger railway station located in the city of Aki, Kōchi Prefecture, Japan. It is operated by the third-sector Tosa Kuroshio Railway with the station number "GN25".

Lines

Layout
The station consists of two opposed side platforms serving two tracks on an embankment. There is no station building but both platforms have shelters comprising enclosed and open compartments. A separate waiting room and bicycle shed, both built of timber, have been set up near the station entrance. From the access road, a low flight of steps leads to the base of the embankment where there is a flight of steps which leads to one platform. Going through an underpass, there is another flight of steps to the other platform.

Adjacent stations

Station mascot
Each station on the Asa Line features a cartoon mascot character designed by Takashi Yanase, a local cartoonist from Kōchi Prefecture. The mascot for Shimoyama Station is a girl in a blue kimono with a white bird on her head. There is a monument to him at nearby Cape Oyama.

History

Passenger statistics
In fiscal 2011, the station was used by an average of 16 passengers daily.

Surrounding area
Japan National Route 55
Aki Municipal Shimoyama Elementary School

See also 
List of railway stations in Japan

References

External links

Railway stations in Kōchi Prefecture
Railway stations in Japan opened in 2002
Aki, Kōchi